The Moheli bulbul (Hypsipetes moheliensis) is a species of songbird in the bulbul family, Pycnonotidae. It is endemic to the Indian Ocean island of Mohéli. Its natural habitat is subtropical or tropical moist montane forests. Until 2011, it was classified as a subspecies of the Grand Comoro bulbul. It is also considered a sister species to the Seychelles bulbul.

Footnotes

References
 Benson, C.W. 1960. The birds of the Comoro Islands: results of the British Ornithologists' Union centenary expedition. Ibis 103b: 5-106
 Warren, B.H., E. Bermingham, R.P. Prŷs-Jones, and C. Thebaud. 2005. Tracking island colonization history and phenotypic shifts in Indian Ocean bulbuls (Hypsipetes: Pycnonotidae). Biological Journal of the Linnean Society 85: 271–287

Hypsipetes
Birds described in 1960
Taxa named by Constantine Walter Benson